Camille Dhont, also known just as Camille (born 12 June 2001) is a Belgian singer and actress.

Biography
Born in Wevelgem, Dhont made her professional debut in 2017, in the stage musical De ridders van de ronde keukentafel. She had her breakout thanks to a leading role in the Ketnet series #LikeMe. In 2021 she made her recording debut with the album Vuurwerk using the mononym Camille. In 2022 she released her  album SOS and held a tour with over 100 dates, including  five sold-out concerts at the Lotto Arena in Antwerp. The same year, she was protagonist of a 9 episodes reality mini series, Camille, Welkom In Mijn Leven ("Camille, Welcome In My Life") and of the two-parts television documentary ‘Ik Ben Camille ("I am Camille"), both broadcast on VTM. In 2023 she won the Music Industry Awards for Best Dutch Language Song and Best Pop Song.

Dhont was the winner of the second season of the Flemish version of The Masked Singer. She also served as an ambassador in the Week Against Bullying.

Discography   
 Studio albums  
Vuurwerk (2021)
SOS (2022)

References

External links
 
 
 

2001 births
Living people
People from Wevelgem
Belgian women singers 
Belgian television actresses
21st-century Belgian singers
21st-century Belgian women singers